Papyrus Oxyrhynchus 110 (P. Oxy. 110 or P. Oxy. I 110) is an invitation to dinner, written in Greek and discovered in Oxyrhynchus. The manuscript was written on papyrus in the form of a sheet. The document was written in the 2nd century. Currently it is housed at Eton College in Eton, Berkshire.

Description 
The document is a formal invitation from Chaeremon to an unnamed person to a dinner at the serapeum. The measurements of the fragment are 44 by 63 mm.

It was discovered by Grenfell and Hunt in 1897 in Oxyrhynchus. The text was published by Grenfell and Hunt in 1898.

Text

See also 
 Oxyrhynchus Papyri
 Papyrus Oxyrhynchus 109
 Papyrus Oxyrhynchus 111

References 

110
2nd-century manuscripts